The 2022–23 season is the 140th season in the existence of Oxford City F. C. and the club's eighth season in National League South. In addition to the league, they will also compete in the 2022–23 FA Cup.

First-team squad

Transfers

In

Out

Pre-season and friendlies

Competitions

Overall record

Natiaonal League South
2022–23 National League South

League table

Results summary

Results by round

Matches

On 23 June, the league fixtures were announced.

FA Cup

Top scorers

References

Oxford City F.C.